Knodus is a genus of characins, small freshwater fish from South America.

Species
There are currently 30 recognized species of this genus:

 Knodus alpha (C. H. Eigenmann, 1914)
 Knodus borki Zarske, 2008
 Knodus breviceps (C. H. Eigenmann, 1908)
 Knodus caquetae Fowler, 1945
 Knodus chapadae (Fowler, 1906)
 Knodus cinarucoense (Román-Valencia, Taphorn & Ruiz-C., 2008)
 Knodus delta Géry, 1972
 Knodus deuterodonoides (C. H. Eigenmann, 1914)
 Knodus dorsomaculatus K. M. Ferreira & Netto-Ferreira, 2010
 Knodus figueiredoi  Esguícero & R. M. C. Castro, 2014
 Knodus gamma  Géry, 1972
 Knodus geryi F. C. T. Lima, Britski & Machado, 2004
 Knodus heteresthes (C. H. Eigenmann, 1908)
 Knodus jacunda (Fowler, 1913)
 Knodus longus Zarske & Géry, 2006
 Knodus megalops G. S. Myers, 1929
 Knodus meridae C. H. Eigenmann, 1911
 Knodus mizquae (Fowler, 1943)
 Knodus moenkhausii (C. H. Eigenmann & C. H. Kennedy, 1903)
 Knodus nuptialis Menezes & Marinho, 2019
 Knodus orteguasae (Fowler, 1943)
 Knodus pasco Zarske, 2007
 Knodus savannensis Géry, 1961
 Knodus septentrionalis Géry, 1972
 Knodus shinahota K. M. Ferreira & Carvajal-Vallejos, 2007
 Knodus smithi (Fowler, 1913)
 Knodus tanaothoros (S. H. Weitzman, Menezes, Evers & J. R. Burns, 2005)
 Knodus tiquiensis K. M. Ferreira & F. C. T. Lima, 2006
 Knodus victoriae (Steindachner, 1907)
 Knodus weitzmani (Menezes, Netto-Ferreira & K. M. Ferreira, 2009)

References

Characidae
Taxa named by Carl H. Eigenmann
Fish of South America